Joseph Marvin Coscarart (November 18, 1909 – April 5, 1993) was an infielder in Major League Baseball who played for the Boston Braves from 1935 to 1936. Coscarart batted and threw right-handed. He was born in Escondido, California. His younger brother, Pete, was an infielder who played with the Brooklyn Dodgers and Pittsburgh Pirates (1938–1946).

In a two-season career, Coscarart posted a .241 batting average with three home runs and 73 RBI in 190 games played.

Coscarart died in Sequim, Washington, at the age of 83.

External links
Baseball Reference
Retrosheet

1909 births
1993 deaths
American people of Basque descent
Baseball players from California
Boston Braves players
Hollywood Stars players
Major League Baseball third basemen
Mission Reds players
Portland Beavers players
San Bernardino Padres players
Seattle Indians players
Seattle Rainiers players
Sportspeople from Escondido, California
St. Paul Saints (AA) players